Patrone may refer to:

 Raffaele Patrone, an Italian sculptor.
 Virginia Patrone , an uruguayan artist.
 Patrone 88, a rifle cartridge.
 Patrón, a brand of tequila.